Coenotoca is a genus of moths of the family Noctuidae.

Species
 Coenotoca subaspersa Walker, [1865]
 Coenotoca unimacula Lower, 1903

References
 Coenotoca at Markku Savela's Lepidoptera and Some Other Life Forms
 Natural History Museum Lepidoptera genus database

Agaristinae